Castleisland A.F.C. is an Irish football club located in Castleisland, County Kerry.
As of 2014, the club fielded teams in the Premier A division of the Kerry District League.

References

Association football clubs in County Kerry
Association football clubs established in 1973
1973 establishments in Ireland